Való Világ 10, also known as Való Világ X powered by Big Brother, is the tenth season of the Hungarian reality television series Való Világ aired by RTL II. It is the third season based on the Big Brother license.

The show started on 14 November 2020. Anikó Nádai and Peti Puskás serve as the main hosts of the show, while Győző Gáspár co-hosts the spin-off show BeleValóVilág.

The daily show is broadcast on RTL II at 10:00 pm from Sunday to Friday and 9:00 pm every Saturday. It is followed by the spin-off show BeleValóVilág at 11:00 pm.

Villa residents

Selections table

Notes 
: Robi moved into the Villa a few minutes before the first selection took place, he received protection.
: Viewers were able to decide which villa resident they thought was most in need of the purple shawl (protection). Virág received the most votes, she received protection.
: The winning pair of the first task, Amanda and Renátó, won a double vote in the first selection.
: On Day 21, the villagers established a hierarchical order among themselves. In the end, Dani came in first, so he got protection.
: In the second selection, there was a tie, the Villa Master - Merci decided who would get the green shawl (selected), she chose Gábor.
: Bálint voluntarily gave up the purple shawl (protection), to be challenged by Gábor.
: Robi became the worker of the week during the Work Week, his reward was a purple shawl (protection).

Villa master

References

External links 
 Official site

2020 Hungarian television seasons
2021 Hungarian television seasons